The Four Hearsemen was a barbershop quartet from Amarillo, Texas, that won the 1955 SPEBSQSA international competition.

References
 AIC entry (archived)

Barbershop quartets
Barbershop Harmony Society